Sanyasi (The Godman) is a 1945 Hindi/Urdu social film directed by A. R. Kardar. Produced under the banner of Kardar Productions, its music director was Naushad with lyrics by Pandit Buddhi Chandra Aggarwal (Pandit Madhur).  The actor Ghulam Mohammed, who had acted in Sohrab Modi's  Ek Din Ka Sultan the same year, played the title role of Sanyasi.

Actor Mehmood played a small role in the film. The other co-stars were Shamim, Amar, Naseem Jr., Shakir and Shyam Kumar.

Cast
 Shamim Bano as Radha
 Gulam Mohammed as Sanyasi
 Amar as Mohan 
 Naseem Jr. as Kiran
 Hasandin as Tulsi
 Shyam Kumar as Chetan
 Shakir as Ramdas
 Mehmood as Banke
 Amir as Chobe

Crew
 Producer: A. R. Kardar
 Director: A. R. Kardar
 Story and Dialogues: Azm Bazidpuri
 Studio: Kardar Productions
 Cinematographer: Dwaka Diwecha
 Editing: M. Moosa
 Art Director Ganga Naik

Soundtrack
The music composer was Naushad and the lyricist was Pandit Madhur. The songs were recorded on the R.C.A. sound label. The songs were sung by Zohrabai Ambalewali, Amar, Shyam Kumar and Naseem Akhtar.

Song List

References

External links
 

1945 films
1940s Hindi-language films
Films directed by A. R. Kardar
Indian black-and-white films
Indian romantic comedy films
Indian romantic musical films
1945 musical comedy films
1940s romantic musical films